Hounslow and Richmond Community Healthcare NHS Trust is an NHS trust which provides adult and children's community health services.

History 
The trust was established on 1 April 2011 as part of the Transforming Community Services initiative from the community services arm of the then Hounslow and Richmond primary care trusts.

Stephen Swords was chair of the board when it was established until he was succeeded by Sian Bates on 1 February 2020. Sukhvinder Kaur-Stubbs was subsequently appointed Chair in Common at Hounslow and Richmond Community Healthcare NHS Trust and Kingston Hospital NHS Foundation Trust from 1 April 2022.

Performance
It was named by the Health Service Journal as one of the top hundred NHS trusts to work for in 2015.  At that time it had 868 full-time equivalent staff and a sickness absence rate of 3.38%. 72% of staff recommend it as a place for treatment and 61% recommended it as a place to work.

The trust now employs 1,140 people. The 2017 national staff survey established the trust as:

 Best community trust nationally for: 68% of employees would recommend the trust as a place to work – national average is 57%; 93% agree their role makes a difference to patients/service users
 Equal best community trust nationally for: 81% of employees are satisfied with the quality of their work and care; 78% would be happy with the standard of care provided by the trust if a friend or relative needed treatment; 69% are satisfied with resources and support; 81% felt motivated at work, better than last year
 Continuing to improve scores in most key areas, including: 90% of the workforce said they had an appraisal in the previous 12 months

The Care Quality Commission rated the trust as requiring improvement in 2016. Subsequently, in 2017, the inpatient unit at Teddington Memorial Hospital was rated 'Good' in all areas. The rapid response and rehabilitation team was identified as an area of outstanding practice as part of that subsequent inspection. In August 2017 the community recovery service was rated good as part of a Hounslow-borough wide inspection of health and care services.

In March 2017 there was a Joint Targeted Area Inspection (JTAI) of the multi-agency response to abuse and neglect in Hounslow, including services provided by HRCH. This found there was effective multi-agency working, in the majority of cases, to improvements in the lives of children living with domestic abuse. It was also noted that health services effectively identify risk to children as a result of domestic abuse, making good-quality, prompt referrals, which clearly identify the risks to children.

In December 2017 the audiology service maintained its accreditation for IQIPS standard (Improving Quality in Physiological Services). The IQIPS scheme is a professionally led assessment and accreditation scheme that is designed to help healthcare organisations ensure that patients receive consistently high-quality services, tests, examinations and procedures delivered by competent staff working in safe environments.

Services and locations 
Some of the services offered by the trust include:

Adult services

 Community nursing, therapies, in-patient unit
 Urgent care and walk-in services
 Richmond Rapid Response Team, Hounslow Integrated Community Response Service,
 Community recovery service

Specialist services

 Neurorehabilitation, continence services and continuing care

 Children's services

 Paediatric (child development; continuing care, therapies) universal children's services (health visiting, community nursing, Family Nurse Partnership), audiology, Hounslow
 School nursing (from April 2018)
 Childhood immunisations
 Richmond, Kingston, Sutton, Merton, Bromley, Bexley, Lambeth and Southwark

Health and wellbeing

 One You Hounslow
 One You Merton
 Live Well Sutton

It is responsible for Teddington Memorial Hospital.

In Hounslow, it provides services from:

 Bedfont clinic
 Brentford Health Centre
 Chiswick Health Centre
 Feltham Centre for Health
 Heart of Hounslow Centre for Health
 Heston Health Centre
 Hounslow House
 Hounslow Urgent Care Centre
 Therapies Centre (O Block - West Middlesex Hospital)

In Richmond, it provides services from:

 Centre House
 Ham Clinic
 Richmond Rehab Unit
 Teddington Health and Social Care Centre
 Teddington Memorial Hospital
 Urgent Treatment Centre at Teddington Memorial Hospital
 Whitton Corner Health and Social Care Centre

References

External links 
 
 Hounslow and Richmond Community Healthcare NHS Trust on the NHS website
 Inspection reports from the Care Quality Commission

Health in London
Community health NHS trusts